Castlevania: Circle of the Moon, titled simply Castlevania in PAL regions, is a platform video game created by Konami for the Game Boy Advance. Published as a launch title in 2001, Circle of the Moon belongs to Konami's Castlevania video game series, the premise of which centers on the eternal conflict between the vampire hunters of the Belmont clan and the vampire Dracula. The game sold one million copies worldwide and was acclaimed by critics. The events of its plot were retconned by former Castlevania producer Koji Igarashi, a move which was met with some criticism.

The game was re-released as part of the Castlevania Advance Collection on September 23, 2021, for the Nintendo Switch, PlayStation 4, Xbox One and Windows. It was bundled alongside Castlevania: Harmony of Dissonance, Castlevania: Aria of Sorrow, and Castlevania: Dracula X.

Gameplay

Circle of the Moon makes use of a 2D side-scrolling style of gameplay, similar to many of the previous Castlevania video games. The objective of Circle of the Moon is to lead player character Nathan Graves through a monster-filled castle as he searches for his kidnapped mentor. Like many of the previous Castlevania protagonists, Nathan uses a whip to attack and defeat enemies, alongside secondary weapons—an axe, cross, holy water, dagger and stopwatch—only one of which may be carried at any time by the player. Hearts, typically found within candles, are used as ammunition for subweapons, with some using more than others. Circle of the Moon follows a nonlinear style of gameplay: at the beginning of the game, Nathan can only traverse certain areas of the castle; by obtaining various abilities, such as becoming able to run, double jump, and wall kick, he gradually explores the castle. He will also encounter rooms with the ability to teleport him across portions of the castle and rooms which will restore his health and allow the player to save their progress in the game. The game automatically updates the castle map to reflect Nathan's progress through it.

Circle of the Moon incorporates role-playing elements. Nathan possesses various statistics: hit points, the amount of damage he can withstand before dying; magic points, how often he can cast a magical attack; strength, the power of his physical attack; defense, his resilience to damage inflicted by the monsters; intelligence, the recovery speed of magic points; and luck, the frequency with which items are dropped by enemies. Defeated enemies drop various items and equipment, and provide experience points; after reaching a predetermined number of experience points, Nathan will level up, and his statistics will improve. The defeat of boss enemies allows the player to acquire new abilities to progress further in the game.

Unique to Circle of the Moon is the Dual Set-up System (DSS), based on magic cards found throughout the game that belong to one of two categories: Action and Attribute. Each of the ten Action card takes its name from one of the gods and goddesses from Roman mythology, and determines the type of magic being performed, while the ten Attribute cards take their names from creatures primarily drawn from Greek and Roman mythology, and add an effect to the magic. To produce a magical effect, the player combines one card from each of the two categories, for a total of one hundred different combinations. In "The Battle Arena"—an optional area of the castle which consists of seventeen rooms filled with stronger versions of monsters found elsewhere in the castle—Nathan's supply of mind points is drained, causing the DSS cards to become temporarily unusable.

Castlevania: Circle of the Moon has four alternative modes of gameplay, which must be completed in order as completion of one mode unlocks the code for the next. Once the player has finished Circle of the Moon for the first time, they receive a code that can be entered as their name when starting a new game; this code will start the game in Magician Mode, in which Nathan has decreased strength and defense, but increased intelligence and begins with all twenty DSS cards. Fighter Mode does not permit the use of DSS cards, but increases his strength and endurance. Shooter Mode allows a higher maximum of hearts he can carry, but gives a penalty to strength, defense, and hit points. Nathan can throw homing daggers if he collects two daggers in a row in this mode. Thief Mode reduces Nathan's strength and defense, but increases his luck greatly.

Plot
Taking place in 1830, Circle of the Moon is set in one of the fictional universes of the Castlevania series. The premise of the original series is the eternal conflict between the vampire hunters of the Belmont clan and the immortal vampire Dracula. Circle of the Moons protagonist, however, is Nathan Graves, whose parents died a decade ago to banish Dracula. Morris Baldwin, who helped in Dracula's banishment, trained him to defeat Dracula and the monsters; Morris ultimately chose him as his successor and gave him the "Hunter Whip", to the displeasure of Hugh, Morris' son who trained alongside him.

At an old castle, Camilla, a minion of Dracula, revives him, only to be interrupted by the arrival of Morris, Nathan, and Hugh. Before they are able to banish him again, Dracula destroys the floor under Nathan and Hugh, causing them to plummet down a long tunnel. Surviving the fall and wishing to find his father, Hugh leaves Nathan behind. Nathan proceeds to search the castle for his mentor. Along the way, he learns that at the next full moon, Morris' soul will be used to return Dracula to full power. He also periodically encounters Hugh, who becomes more hostile as the game progresses. Eventually, Nathan encounters Camilla, who hints that she and Dracula are responsible for the changes in his personality. Nathan vanquishes Camilla in her true form and meets up with Hugh once more. Upon seeing him, Hugh immediately attacks him with the goal of proving himself to his father through Nathan's defeat; Nathan, however, realizes that Dracula is controlling Hugh. Nathan defeats him, and Dracula's control over Hugh breaks. Confessing that he doubted his self-worth when Nathan was chosen as successor, Hugh tasks him with Morris' rescue.

Arriving at the ceremonial room, Nathan confronts Dracula, who confirms that he had tampered with Hugh's soul to cause the changes in his personality. They begin to fight and halfway through, Dracula teleports away to gain his full power. Hugh then frees his father and tasks Nathan with Dracula's banishment. Nathan continues the battle and defeats Dracula; escaping the collapsing castle, he reunites with Morris and Hugh. Nathan is declared a master vampire hunter by Morris. Hugh vows to retrain under Morris due to his failure.

Development
Developed by Konami Computer Entertainment Kobe, Circle of the Moon was designed as a launch title for the Game Boy Advance. At the 2000 Tokyo Game Show, a playable demo of it debuted, which featured two selectable player characters: Hugh and Nathan. The option to play as Hugh did not appear in the final version of the game. Circle of the Moon was published by Konami in Japan on March 21, 2001, in North America on June 11, 2001, and as Castlevania in the PAL region on June 22, 2001; it also saw a Japanese-only re-release under the "Konami the Best" label on November 3, 2005. It was published on the Wii U Virtual Console on October 9, 2014, in North America.

Reception

Reviews

Circle of the Moon received widespread critical acclaim. On the review aggregate site Metacritic, it is the twelfth-highest rated Game Boy Advance title.

Japanese gaming magazine Famitsu gave the game a 27 out of 40 score. Craig Harris of IGN called Circle of the Moon "one of the best playing Castlevania games released", calling the gameplay "very long and extremely challenging without being frustrating or a chore to zip through". However, they noted that due to the dark graphics, the game was "difficult" to see, and that the character animations looked as though "they've been ripped out of a GBC development". GamePro said that the game closely mirrored the most highly acclaimed Castlevania game, Symphony of the Night with its rich graphics and branching story. RPGamer also praised the new system, calling it a "breath of fresh air" when combined with the existing ideas from previous entries in the series, though in contrast felt the game had significant replay value due to its various additional modes and the strengths/weaknesses related to each that required new strategies. Despite their criticism of the plot and recycled elements, they summarized the title as "Konami's Second Symphony". GameSpy stated that while the graphics were a problem, they more readily attributed the issue to the Game Boy Advance itself than the game, adding "it's a horror game about Dracula, don't you want ample light around you anyway?" They also praised the game's music and sound effects as appropriate for the title, though they criticized the lack of decent artificial intelligence on the part of the enemies. NextGen called it "one of the best 2D action-adventure games ever made – for any platform." However, Edge gave the Japanese import seven out of ten, saying, "There is little of note that can be considered new, and yet the balance of play is as strong as ever – Konami's original formula shines through, a mix of quality platforming, fine graphics and undeniable branding. Age has not withered the mix at all." Game Informers Tim Turi felt in the game's retrospective that it was the first game to imitate Symphony of the Nights style but criticized the dark visuals.

Sales
IGN reported on July 23, 2001, that Circle of the Moon sold over 500,000 units, with over 300,000 sold in North America and about 200,000 sold in Europe.

Awards
The game was nominated for "Best Action-Adventure Game" and "Best Game Boy Advance Game" at GameSpots Best and Worst of 2001 Awards, both of which went to Grand Theft Auto III and Advance Wars, respectively. It was also a runner-up for "Console Role-Playing Game of the Year" at the Academy of Interactive Arts & Sciences' 5th Annual Interactive Achievement Awards, which went to Baldur's Gate: Dark Alliance.

Legacy
Despite the game's success, series producer Koji Igarashi, who had not been involved in its production, was critical of the game. When developing follow-up title Castlevania: Harmony of Dissonance, he cited in an interview several flaws he felt should have been rectified in Circle of the Moons design, primarily its control scheme and the dark appearance of the graphics on the Game Boy Advance. He additionally criticized the DSS card system, stating that it "did not match with the world Castlevania had established over a long period of time", though admitted he felt it was a good system. In 2002, Circle of the Moon was removed from the series' timeline, a move met with some resistance from fans. Igarashi noted the reason for the removal was not due to his non-involvement with the game, but instead the intention of the game's development team for Circle of the Moon to be a stand-alone title.

Notes

References

External links
 

2001 video games
Circle of the Moon
Game Boy Advance games
Gargoyles in popular culture
Fiction set in 1830
Metroidvania games
Nintendo Switch games
PlayStation 4 games
Side-scrolling role-playing video games
Single-player video games
Video games developed in Japan
Video games scored by Taro Kudo
Video games set in the 19th century
Virtual Console games
Virtual Console games for Wii U
Windows games
Xbox One games